Audhild Bakken Rognstad  (born 16 February 1991) is a Norwegian ski orienteering competitor.

At the 2015 World Ski Orienteering Championships she won a silver medal in women's sprint, while she placed 5th in the middle distance and 8th in the long distance.

References

External links
 

1991 births
Living people
Norwegian orienteers
Ski-orienteers
21st-century Norwegian people